Anatjari Tjakamarra (c. 1930–1992) was a Central Australian Aboriginal artist who was part of the Papunya Tula art movement. He came from the area of Kulkuta, southeast of Kiwirrkura in Western Australia. He was a Pintupi man.

He came to Papunya in the early 1966 from the Western Desert (relocated by the Weapons Research Establishment). He was working in Papunya as a school gardener when Geoffrey Bardon began encouraging the men to paint using western style materials in the early 1970s. After, in the 1980s, he got into photo art, and made multiple art exhibits around the globe.

He left Papunya at the start of the outstation movement, establishing Tjukula in Western Australia, southeast of his birthplace and near the Northern Territory border. During much of the 1980s, when this painting was done, he worked and sold his art independently.

After settling at Kiwirrkura late in the decade, he began working through Papunya Tula Pty Ltd. He had his first solo exhibition at Gallery Gabrielle Pizzi in 1989, and another in the same year at the John Weber Gallery in New York. The Metropolitan Museum of Art acquired his painting Tingari Dreaming Cycle tin the early 1990s; this represented the first acquisition by a major international museum of a contemporary Aboriginal artwork. His work is held in most major Australian collections, including the Museum and Art Gallery of the Northern Territory (MAGNT),  the Art Gallery of South Australia (one work),  the National Gallery of Victoria (one work), the Art Gallery of New South Wales (2 works), as well as the Kluge-Ruhe Aboriginal Art Collection of the University of Virginia.

Notes

1992 deaths
Australian Aboriginal artists
Indigenous Australians from Western Australia
Year of birth uncertain
20th-century Australian painters
Pintupi
People from Goldfields-Esperance
Artists from the Northern Territory